The Caucasus Research Resource Center (CRRC)-Armenia is a part of a joint project of the Eurasia Foundation (EF) and the Carnegie Corporation of New York, has been hosted by the Yerevan State University and open to the public and actively conducting programming since June 2003. The centers were first conceived of in 2001 to create university-based centers of excellence in the South Caucasus that provide professional training and research resources in the social sciences to researchers and practitioners. 

The regional network  of centers was created to address the critical need for targeted assistance, including resources and training, to support social science research and public policy reform in the South Caucasus countries of Armenia, Azerbaijan and Georgia.

Caucasus